Blessed Leopold of Alpandeire (24 June 1864 – 9 February 1956) – born Francisco Tomás de San Juan Bautista Márquez y Sánchez – was a Spanish Roman Catholic professed religious of the Order of Friars Minor Capuchin. His life is not distinguished for spectacular works but rather for the humble and simple life in which he led his life as well as for his kindness – in particular towards the most deprived persons. He spent most of his life in Granada where its people still remember and celebrate him as a model example of Christian life and virtue.

The cause for his canonization commenced in 1982 when he was made a Servant of God and he was later named as Venerable on 15 March 2008. Archbishop Angelo Amato presided over his beatification on 12 September 2010 on the behalf of Pope Benedict XVI.

Biography

Early life
Francisco Tomás de San Juan Bautista Márquez y Sánchez was born on 24 June 1864, in Alpandeire, Spain, a small village in the province of Málaga (southern Spain), and was baptized on the following 29 June 1864. His parents, Diego Márquez y Ayala and Jerónima Sánchez y Jiménez, were industrious peasants. He was the eldest son out of four children from that marriage (two other boys and one sister). His brothers were called Diego and Juan Miguel, and his sister, María Teresa.

Márquez decided to embrace religious life in 1894, at the age of 35. His decision came after he witnessed a Capuchin friar preaching in the city of Ronda. He later declared that the secluded way of life of those men had made a good impression on him . He felt attracted by the idea of serving God by becoming similar to them.

Religious life

He decided to devote himself to religious life after hearing two Capuchin friars preach in the city of Ronda, on the occasion of the beatification of the friar, Didacus Joseph of Cadiz, in 1894. Even though he communicated his religious intention to the Capuchin friars in Ronda, it was not until five years later that he became part of the Capuchin Order.  After several attempts were unsuccessful, he joined in 1899 as a postulant in the friary of the Capuchin Order in Seville. In 1900 he entered the novitiate and received the religious name of Leopold. After successive assignments to Antequera, Granada and Seville again, on 21 February 1914 Leopold was moved permanently to the friary in Granada, where he lived for the next 42 years.

Most of the time Leopold served as the quaestor (seeker) of the community, which had him walk around the city and into many homes requesting donations. Gradually he became a familiar sight in the city, so many people sought his advice or intercession, beginning to know him as "the humble beggar of the three Hail Marys," because that was the prayer dedicated to those who sought his blessing.

Leopold died in Granada on 9 February 1956, and is buried in a crypt of the friary church dedicated to his honor.

References

External links

 Vicepostulación de Fray Leopoldo (Catholic Association in charge of the promotion of the Blessed Leopoldo canonization process) 
 Order of Capuchin Friars Minor

1864 births
1956 deaths
Capuchins
Beatified Roman Catholic religious brothers
Spanish beatified people
Franciscan beatified people
People from the Province of Málaga
Beatifications by Pope Benedict XVI
Venerated Catholics by Pope Benedict XVI